The 1816 United States presidential election in Massachusetts took place between November 1 and 3, 1816, as part of the 1816 United States presidential election. Voters chose 22 representatives, or electors to the Electoral College, who voted for President and Vice President.

During this election, the Federalist candidate Rufus King along with his running mate John E. Howard ran unopposed in the state. This was the last election in Massachusetts to include what is now the state of Maine, which achieved statehood in 1820.

Results

See also
 United States presidential elections in Massachusetts

References

Massachusetts
1816
1816 Massachusetts elections